Nain is a settlement west of Greenock in the northern Barossa Valley region of South Australia. It was first settled in the 1850s, mostly by German settlers moving from the Mount Barker area. The Nain "Zum Schmalen Wege" church operated from 1861 to 1893, and the present Nain church opened in 1856. Both have cemeteries.

References

Towns in South Australia